Macclesfield railway station was a short lived railway station serving the town of Macclesfield in Cheshire, England. It was opened in 1869 by the Macclesfield, Bollington and Marple Railway (MB&M) - a joint line constructed and operated by the Manchester, Sheffield and Lincolnshire Railway (MS&L) and North Staffordshire Railways (NSR) - and closed in 1873.

The MB&M was built with the intention of connecting to the main London and North Western Railway (LNWR) / NSR line between Manchester and Stoke however there were numerous difficulties to be overcome; the route through town, the reluctance of the local authority to allow the railway to bridge over the River Bollin and the lack of co-operation from the LNWR to agree to a site for a station on the Manchester - Stoke line. The board of the MB&M therefore decided to open a temporary station on land they already owned to allow services to commence. The station, known simply as Macclesfield, opened on 2 August 1869 and was the southern terminus of the line.

Four years elapsed before a route for the line through the town was constructed and a new joint NSR/MS&L station at  built.  The new Central station opened on 1 July 1873 and the old station closed the same day.  Following closure the old station buildings were used as stables for the horses working in the MB&M goods yard until the buildings were demolished in 1947.  In 1919 they had seen temporary use, once again, as a passenger station when rebuilding work of the section of line to Central station  was undertaken.

References
Notes

Sources

Railway stations in Great Britain opened in 1869
Railway stations in Great Britain closed in 1873
Disused railway stations in Cheshire
Former Macclesfield Committee stations
1869 establishments in England
Macclesfield